Willem David Daniel Tomlinson (born 27 January 1998) is an English professional footballer who plays as a midfielder for National League North club Chorley.

Club career

Blackburn Rovers
Tomlinson began in the youth ranks of EFL Championship side Blackburn Rovers from 2009. He was unused substitute on three occasions in the Championship, prior to making his first-team debut on 19 February 2017 in an FA Cup fifth-round tie against Manchester United. His league debut came a week later versus Derby County. On 3 November 2017, Tomlinson signed a new contract with Blackburn. However, he terminated his contract just over a year later in January 2019.

Mansfield Town
Prior to officially leaving Blackburn Rovers, Tomlinson trained with Exeter City. However, on 4 February 2019, Tomlinson signed a contract with fellow EFL League Two club Mansfield Town. He left Mansfield Town in September 2020, by mutual consent.  He subsequently joined North West Counties Premier Division side Padiham to keep fit and started the two opening games of the season.

Chorley
On 20 November 2020, Tomlinson signed for Chorley on a permanent contract.

Career statistics

References

External links
 

1998 births
Living people
Footballers from Burnley
English footballers
Association football midfielders
English Football League players
National League (English football) players
North West Counties Football League players
Blackburn Rovers F.C. players
Mansfield Town F.C. players
Padiham F.C. players
Chorley F.C. players